The canton of Chabanais is a former administrative division in central France. It had 7,885 inhabitants (2012). It was disbanded following the French canton reorganisation which came into effect in March 2015. It consisted of 11 communes, which joined the canton of Charente-Vienne in 2015:
Chabanais
Chabrac
Chassenon
Chirac
Étagnac
Exideuil
La Péruse
Pressignac
Saint-Quentin-sur-Charente
Saulgond
Suris

See also
Cantons of the Charente department

References

Former cantons of Charente
2015 disestablishments in France
States and territories disestablished in 2015